Cauterize is the second studio album by Tremonti, a band fronted by Creed and Alter Bridge guitarist Mark Tremonti. In addition to Tremonti, who provides both lead vocals and guitar, the album features rhythm guitarist and backing vocalist Eric Friedman and drummer Garrett Whitlock. It is the first Tremonti album to feature Wolfgang Van Halen, who replaced Brian Marshall as the band's bassist after the release of the band's first album, All I Was, in 2012. Cauterize was released on June 9, 2015 in the United States. The album was set to release in Australia on June 5 but saw an earlier release by a day, thus being released on June 4, 2015.

Reception

Cauterize was released to critical acclaim. Allmusic's James Christopher Monger did not award a star rating to the album (as with All I Was), but he was nonetheless positive in his appraisal, stating "The ten-track set is bolstered by a pair of strong singles in "Another Heart" and "Flying Monkeys," as well as some deft work from new bass player Wolfgang Van Halen."  Revolver gave it 3.5 out of 5, saying of the album, "Like 2012's All I Was, Cauterize is another successful fusion of thrash metal, soaring solos and Tremonti 's powerful post-grunge vocals". About.com stated, "Tremonti is in control as a frontman, slinging out devilish riffs and passionate vocals. Cauterize is not just for fans of the guitarist or his other projects, but those that love music that is both aggressive and infectious" and gave the album 4 out of 5 stars. Ultimate Guitar gave the album 8.3/10 and said they felt like the album had a lot more sonic variety than expected, and they found themselves impressed with things they weren't even expecting from Mark Tremonti, including "the deep and introspective nature of the lyrics, some of the softer and slower passages, and the awesome vocal performance." However, they thought Wolfgang Van Halen's playing was a weak point on the album.

CrypticRock gave Cauterize a perfect 5 out of 5 score, saying "Tremonti colors his music with a message of hope and wraps it inside those hard-hitting, skin-pounding beats that take the listener from tumultuous storms to calm seas, but these contradictions in mood are intentional, crafted in a calculated and meticulous manner" and that "Tremonti strives for perfection, to make the next creative endeavor better than the previous, and each one proves to be just that."

Cauterize sold approximately 13,000 copies in its first week, debuting at #40 on the US Billboard Top 200 albums chart.

Track listing

Personnel
Tremonti
 Mark Tremonti – lead guitar, lead vocals, arrangement
 Eric Friedman – rhythm guitar, backing vocals, arrangement
 Garrett Whitlock – drums, arrangement
 Wolfgang Van Halen – bass, backing vocals, arrangement

Production
 Michael "Elvis" Baskette – producer, mixing, arrangement
 Jef Moll – engineer
 Ted Jensen – mastering

Charts

References

External links
 

Albums produced by Michael Baskette
Mark Tremonti albums
2015 albums